Vyasanagar College, Jajpur Road, Jajpur, Odisha is the 29th Autonomous college of Odisha. The autonomous status was granted in February 2009, renewed on 2016 by University Grants Commission (UGC) of India.

History 
The college started with Arts subjects at the Intermediate level. However, in 1966 the college got affiliated to Utkal University, Bhubaneshwar and after that higher classes were added. 

The college got 2f and 12B status from the U.G.C. in 1969. Later, I.Com and I.Sc classes started in 1975 and 1978, respectively, whereas the B.Com and B.Sc classes started in 1977 and 1981.

Facilities 
The college spreads across almost 26 acres and has the student strength of the college is more than 3600. The college has its own Library with study centre, computer point, and sports facilities, shooting range in addition to a grievance redressal cell, a parking shed and a common room. The total built up area is about 106175 sq ft. with a sports ground of about 8 acres. The college has an adequate number of classrooms, lecture halls and laboratories. The college library holds about 46000 volumes, 26 journals/ periodicals/ magazines.

Hostels and canteens 
The college has hostels for boys (1 hostel) and girls (2 hostels) and housing for faculty and a guest gouse. The college also houses a small canteen at the back side.

Faculties and staff 
The teaching staff includes permanent faculty, 74 in numbers, 8 part-time teachers, and 34 non-teaching and 31 technical staff. The student teacher ratio is 29:1.

Academics

Admissions 
Admissions of students to the various courses of study are made on the basis of their academic records. As per the policy of the State Government, SC and ST students, students from other weaker sections, holders of merit certificates of NCC, NSS and sports are given preference in admission.

Courses offered 
The college offers Undergraduate education in Botany, Chemistry, Geology, Mathematics, Physics and Zoology for B.Sc., in English language, Education, Economics, History, Oriya, Philosophy, Political Science, Psychology and Sanskrit are offered under B.A. and under Accountancy and Management for B.Com, in total 17 options in undergraduate programs.

From 2004, the college also offers self-financing programs at Certificate/ Diploma level in Computer Science, Refrigeration and Hospital Waste Management.

Examinations 
The college has an annual system of examination. The test, mid-term and terminal examinations are conducted to check the progress of the students. This helps in mid-term course correction.

Magazines 
Annual college magazine, "Vyasashree" and a Wall Magazine, 'Vyasaprava' are published to inculcate creativity among all students regardless of gender.

Future prospects 
 With the rapid industrialization in the area nearby, Kalinganagar (the steel hub of India), and of the needs of the locality, the college may introduce additional courses applicable to the growth, such as Communicative English, Basic Computer Literacy, Travel and Tourism, Tax Planning, Management of Small Scale Industry Units, Event Management, Herbal and Medicinal Plant Nursery Management
 More facilities and training to be provided to enable more number of students to succeed in the examinations like UGC-CSIR (NET), SLET, GATE, Civil Services, GRE, TOEFL and GMAT
 Further steps may be taken up to connect the library with other libraries

References

 Jajpur District Portal
 Utkal University, Odisha, List of affiliated colleges

Universities and colleges in Odisha
Buildings and structures in Jajpur district
Autonomous Colleges of Odisha
Department of Higher Education, Odisha
Educational institutions established in 1966
1966 establishments in Orissa